Akbarabad-e Khaleseh Tappeh Ginu (also Romanized as Akbarābād-e Khāleṣeh Tappeh Gīnū; also known as Akbarābād) is a village in Miyan Darband Rural District, in the Central District of Kermanshah County, Kermanshah Province, Iran. At the 2006 census, its population was 133, in 27 families.

References 

Populated places in Kermanshah County